Goran Ivanišević defeated Andriy Medvedev in the final, 6–4, 6–2, 7–6(7–2) to win the singles tennis title at the 1993 Paris Open.

Boris Becker was the defending champion, but lost in the quarterfinals to Arnaud Boetsch.

Seeds
A champion seed is indicated in bold text while text in italics indicates the round in which that seed was eliminated.

  Pete Sampras (quarterfinals)
  Jim Courier (second round)
  Boris Becker (quarterfinals)
  Michael Stich (quarterfinals)
  Sergi Bruguera (second round)
  Stefan Edberg (semifinals)
  Michael Chang (third round)
  Andriy Medvedev (final)
  Goran Ivanišević (champion)
  Cédric Pioline (second round)
  Richard Krajicek (second round)
  Petr Korda (third round)
  Todd Martin (third round)
  Karel Nováček (third round)
  Alexander Volkov (second round)
  Wally Masur (second round)

Draw

 ''NB: The Final was the best of 5 sets.

Finals

Top half

Section 1

Section 2

Bottom half

Section 3

Section 4

Qualifying

Qualifying seeds

Qualifiers

Qualifying draw

First qualifier

Second qualifier

Third qualifier

Fourth qualifier

Fifth qualifier

Sixth qualifier

References

External links
 Official results archive (ATP)
 Official results archive (ITF)

Singles